Mount Howard Douglas is a  mountain summit located immediately east of the Banff Sunshine ski resort in Banff National Park of Alberta, Canada. It was named for Howard Douglas (1850-1929), a park superintendent credited with greatly expanding its size. The mountain's name was officially adopted in 1958 when approved by the Geographical Names Board of Canada. Its nearest higher peak is Mount Bourgeau,  to the north-northwest.


Geology

Like other mountains in Banff Park, Mount Howard Douglas is composed of sedimentary rock laid down from the Precambrian to Jurassic periods. Formed in shallow seas, this sedimentary rock was pushed east and over the top of younger rock during the Laramide orogeny.

Climate

Based on the Köppen climate classification, Mount Howard Douglas is located in a subarctic climate zone with cold, snowy winters, and mild summers. Winter temperatures can drop below -20 °C with wind chill factors below -30 °C.  Precipitation runoff from Mount Howard Douglas drains into tributaries of the Bow River.

See also
Geography of Alberta

Gallery

References

External links
 Weather: Mount Howard Douglas
 Parks Canada web site: Banff National Park

Howard Douglas
Howard Douglas
Howard Douglas
Howard Douglas